Olympic Weightlifting Gymnasium located in the Olympic Park area of Seoul, South Korea. It was constructed between August 1984 and April 1986, and hosted the weightlifting at the 1986 Asian Games and two years later the same sport at 1988 Summer Olympics.

It has since been renamed to Woori Arts Hall and is currently a musical theatre.

Events
 Musical Hong Gil Dong from 18 February to 18 April 2010, with the historical figure Hong Gildong played by Sungmin and Yesung of Super Junior.
 Super Junior K.R.Y The 1st Concert – 11 to 13 February 2011.
 Musical Fame from 25 November 2011 to 29 January 2012.

References

External links
1988 Summer Olympics official report. Volume 1. Part 1. p. 176.
Theatre information 

Venues of the 1988 Summer Olympics
Olympic weightlifting venues
Indoor arenas in South Korea
Theatres in South Korea
Sports venues in Seoul
Sports venues completed in 1986
Olympic Park, Seoul
Venues of the 1986 Asian Games